Proconodontidae is an extinct family of conodonts in the order Proconodontida.

It consists of the genus Proconodontus.

References

External links 

 

Conodont families
Proconodontida